Samuel Elías Mejías [may-hee'-ahs] (born May 9, 1952) is a former backup outfielder in Major League Baseball who played from  through  for the St. Louis Cardinals (1976), Montreal Expos (1977–78), Chicago Cubs (1979) and Cincinnati Reds (1979–81). Listed at 6'0", 170 lb., Mejías batted and threw right-handed. He was born in Santiago de los Caballeros, Dominican Republic. His brother, Marcos Mejias also played professional baseball.

Baseball career

Minor Leagues
Mejias was signed as a minor league free agent on October 24, 1970 by the Milwaukee Brewers Brewers. On June 23, 1976 the Brewers sent Sam Mejias to the St. Louis Cardinals to complete the earlier deal made on June 7, 1976. (June 7, 1976: The Milwaukee Brewers sent a player to be named later to the St. Louis Cardinals for Danny Frisella).

St Louis Cardinals
Mejias made his Major League debut on September 6, 1976. He would play 17 games for the Cardinals, batting .143.

Montreal Expos
He was traded along with Bill Greif and Ángel Torres from the Cardinals to the Montreal Expos for Tony Scott, Steve Dunning and Pat Scanlon on November 8, 1976.

Cincinnati Reds
Mejias' contract was purchased by the Cincinnati Reds. Mejias only appeared in 7 games for the Reds in 1979, but he had two serviceable years as a part time player for the Reds in 1980 and 1981 batting .278 and .286 respectively. He was released by the Reds after their 1981 season.

Career
In a six-season career, Mejías was a .247 hitter (86-for-348) with four home runs and 31 RBI in 334 games, including 51 runs, 13 doubles, two triples, and eight stolen bases.  Mejias was more known for his defensive abilities than offensive aptitude.

Post career

See also
List of players from Dominican Republic in Major League Baseball

References

External links

1952 births
Living people
Baltimore Orioles coaches
Chicago Cubs players
Cincinnati Reds players
Dominican Republic expatriate baseball players in Canada
Dominican Republic expatriate baseball players in the United States
Eugene Emeralds managers
Major League Baseball players from the Dominican Republic
Major League Baseball first base coaches
Major League Baseball outfielders
Montreal Expos players
People from Santiago de los Caballeros
St. Louis Cardinals players
Seattle Mariners coaches
Danville Warriors players
Indianapolis Indians players
Newark Co-Pilots players
Piratas de Campeche players
Shreveport Captains players
Spokane Indians players
Thetford Mines Miners players
Tulsa Oilers (baseball) players
Dominican Republic expatriate baseball players in Mexico